Eugene V. Gallagher (born June 23, 1950)  is an American professor of religious studies at Connecticut College.  His department lists his specializations as: History of religion, New religious movements, New Testament and early Christianity, Western scriptures and traditions.  He is the author of several books, mainly on the topic of new religious movements. Gallagher is the Rosemary Park Professor Emeritus of Religious Studies at Connecticut College, where he worked from 1978 to 2015, and is currently an Adjunct Professor of Religious Studies at the College of Charleston.

In 1995 Gallagher and James D. Tabor, an associate professor of religious studies at the University of North Carolina, co-authored Why Waco? Cults and the Battle for Religious Freedom in America.  The book partly blamed the 1993 Waco siege, which resulted in the deaths of 76 members of the Branch Davidian sect, on a misunderstanding of religious issues by law enforcement personnel.

References

External links 
 Gallagher, Eugene - College of Charleston

1950 births
Living people
Researchers of new religious movements and cults
Connecticut College faculty
College of Charleston faculty